Princess Taihe (太和公主, personal name unknown), later known as Princess Ding'an (定安公主) or Princess Anding (安定公主), was a princess of the Chinese Tang Dynasty and a Khatun (empress) of Huigu.  She was married to Huige's Chongde Khan as part of the Heqin system of marriages between Tang princesses and Huigu khans, but suffered through Huigu's subsequent collapse before being welcomed back to the Tang court.

Background and entry into marriage 
It is not known when Princess Taihe was born, although it is known that she was a daughter of Emperor Xianzong (r. 805–820) and Emperor Xianzong's wife Consort Guo, and that she was younger than her full brother Li Heng, who was born in 795.  She was Emperor Xianzong's 10th daughter over all.

Late in Emperor Xianzong's reign, Huigu, then reigned by Baoyi Khan, made repeated overtures to request a Tang princess to be married to Baoyi Khan under the Heqin system.  Eventually, after a mission headed by the Huigu diplomat Hedagan (合達干), Emperor Muzong agreed to have Princess Taihe's older sister Princess Yong'an married to Baoyi Khan — but as Baoyi died in 821, the marriage never took place.  After Baoyi Khan died in 821 and was succeeded by Chongde Khan, Chongde Khan continued to seek marriage with a Tang princess, and he sent a delegation including a number of officials and two Huigu princesses, along with a bride price of horses and camels.  Later in 821, Li Heng, who was by now emperor (as Emperor Muzong), agreed to marry Princess Taihe to Chongde Khan.  When another neighbor state, Tufan, became aware of the Tang-Huigu marriage, it was incensed and attacked Fort Qingsai (青塞堡, in modern Yulin, Shaanxi), but the Tufan attack was repelled.  On August 28, she departed the Tang capital Chang'an, escorted by the general Hu Zheng (胡証), assisted by the other officials Li Xian (李憲) and Yin You (殷侑).  Anticipating a possible attempt to Tufan forces to intercept Princess Taihe's train, Huigu forces were dispatched to escort them as well as to attack Tufan's borders.  Emperor Muzong issued an edict permitting Princess Taihe to maintain a staff on the same level of staffing as an imperial prince.

Princess Taihe's train did not arrive at the Huigu court until late 822.  When they approached the Huigu court, Chongde Khan sent a group of several hundred soldiers to welcome her and escort her to the Huigu court, but Hu declined on the basis that his mission was to escort the princess to Chongde Khan and therefore he had to complete that final leg of the mission.  After they arrived at the Huigu court and an appropriate date was set, Chongde Khan created her as Khatun — the Khan's wife.  The wedding, as described by the Old Book of Tang, went in this manner:

Before Hu and his staff were ready to depart, Princess Taihe held a feast for them, and it was said that she wept for over a day and kept them for that duration, before they actually departed.  Chongde Khan awarded them with great treasure.

As Khatun 
In 824, Chongde Khan died and was succeeded by his brother Yaoluoge Hesa (藥羅葛曷薩) (as Zhaoli Khan).  Princess Taihe remained in Huigu, although it is not clear whether she remarried Zhaoli Khan or any other person.  In 832, Zhaoli Khan was assassinated by his subordinates, and his nephew Yaoluge Hu (藥羅葛胡) succeeded him (as Zhangxin Khan).

In 839, after a rebellion by the officials Anyunhe (安允合) and Chaile (柴勒), Zhangxin Khan was able to defeat and kill them, but a subsequent attack by another official, Jueluowu (掘羅勿), along with the Shatuo chief Zhuye Chixin, defeated Zhangxin Khan, and Zhangxin Khan committed suicide.  The nobles supported another member of the royal family, Yaoluoge Hesa (藥羅葛闔馺, not same person as Zhaoli Khan) as khan.  That year, it was said that in addition to these wars, there was a major plague and major snow storm, causing great deaths of the Huigu livestock and leading to its sudden decline.

In 840, a major Xiajiasi attack on Huigu destroyed the Huigu headquarters, and both Yaoluoge Hesa and Jueluowu were killed in battle.  The remaining Huigu forces scattered.  In 841, one of the major generals, Wamosi, submitted to Tang (which was then ruled by Emperor Muzong's son Emperor Wuzong), and Emperor Wuzong issued an edict to Wamosi ordering him to seek out Princess Taihe.  Meanwhile, though, Princess Taihe was actually taken captive by the Xiajiasi khan Are (阿熱), but Are, who claimed ancestry from the Han Dynasty general Li Ling and thus a common ancestry with Tang emperors (through Li Ling's grandfather Li Guang), treated her with respect and sent a group of generals to escort Princess Taihe back to Tang territory.  On the way, though, one of the remnant Huigu leaders who had claimed khan title, Yaoluoge Wuxi (藥羅葛烏希, with title of Wujie Khan) ambushed the Xiajiasi escort and took Princess Taihe.  He had her write to Emperor Wuzong requesting that Emperor Wuzong create him the new khan and also lend the border city of Zhenwu (振武, in modern Hohhot, Inner Mongolia) to him to allow him to plan the rebuilding of Huigu.  Emperor Wuzong responded with an edict that instructed Wujie Khan to remain outside Tang borders and requested Princess Taihe to personally return to Chang'an to report on Huigu's status.

Wujie Khan did not follow Emperor Wuzong's orders, and Huigu remnants under him pillaged Tang's northern territory in earnest.  He also made another request to borrow the border city of Tiande (天德, in modern Bayan Nur, Inner Mongolia), which Emperor Wuzong rejected.  Emperor Wuzong further wrote a rebuking letter to Wujie Khan and warning of consequences, again ordering him to have Princess Taihe personally report and make requests.  Emperor Wuzong also mobilized the forces of the circuits on the northern border, preparing a major retributive campaign against Wujie Khan.  In winter 842, he also had the chancellor Li Deyu write a letter in his own name, addressed to Princess Taihe, sending it to the Huigu remnants along with winter clothes as a gift for Princess Taihe:

In 843, Wujie Khan launched an attack on Zhenwu.  Tang forces, commanded by the general Shi Xiong, prepared a surprise counter-attack.  When he arrived near the Huigu camp, he noticed that there were some special wagons lined with rugs, and that the servants in those wagons were wearing red- and green-colored robes that appeared to be Chinese.  He sent a scout to make contact and found out that these were Princess Taihe's train.  He then had the scout again inform Princess Taihe of his plans to attack, and asked her and her servants to remain calm and not move during the attack.  At night, he made a surprise attack on Wujie Khan's tent, and Wujie Khan's forces collapsed.  Wujie Khan fled, and Shi then escorted Princess Taihe back to Tang territory.

After return to Tang 
On April 4, 843, Princess Taihe arrived at Chang'an.  Emperor Wuzong ordered the chancellors and the other officials to welcome and honor her.  She took off her grand clothes and jewels, and she approached the palace, apologizing for the failure of her mission.  Emperor Wuzong sent eunuchs to comfort her and put her robes and jewels back on, and then welcomed her into the palace.  The next day, she had a reunion with her mother Grand Empress Dowager Guo, and she was created the title of Grand Princess Ding'an (per the New Book of Tang) or Grand Princess Anding (per the Zizhi Tongjian).  Seven princesses did not attend the welcoming ceremony, and Emperor Wuzong, in anger, took away a portion of their stipend and the silk customarily given to them.  This was the last historical reference to her, and it is not known when she died.

Notes and references

Sources
 Old Book of Tang, vol. 195.
 New Book of Tang, vols. 83, 217, part 2.
 Zizhi Tongjian, vols. 241, 242, 246, 247.

Tang dynasty princesses
Uyghurs
9th-century Chinese women
9th-century Chinese people
Daughters of emperors
Ädiz clan